The Vienna Dragons founded in 1985 (until 1999 as Klosterneuburg Mercenaries, between 2000 and 2022 as Danube Dragons) are a 2-time AFL-champion American football club based in Vienna, Austria.

History
Under the name Klosterneuburg Mercenaries the Dragons were among the first American football teams in Austria and ascended up to the Austrian Football League, the highest league in Austria. During the 1990s they advanced into 2 Austrian Bowls (1990 and 1997), but they lost both against Graz Giants. In 2000 they changed their name into Danube Dragons. They have moved from Klosterneuburg into Korneuburg in 2008, and into Vienna in 2012 (playing in FC Stadlau field). 

In 2010 they won the Austrian Bowl XXVI defeating the Swarco Raiders Tirol in the final. In 2022, the Dragons won the Austrian Bowl defeating the Vienna Vikings 51–29. 

The team currently plays in Vienna at the Donaufeld stadium.

References 

American football teams in Austria
Sport in Vienna